Norman Joseph Ogilvie (born April 8, 1974) is a retired American professional golfer.

Ogilvie was born in Lancaster, Ohio and graduated from Duke University. He played on the PGA Tour and picked up his only win on tour at the U.S. Bank Championship in Milwaukee in 2007. He has also won four tournaments on the Nationwide Tour.

In 2014, Ogilvie announced his retirement from professional golf. He ended his career at the Wyndham Championship, his 399th PGA Tour start. He finished 77th, last of those who made the cut. Outside of golf, Ogilvie is an follower of the stock market and owns an investment advisory firm. He is a Republican.

Professional wins (5)

PGA Tour wins (1)

PGA Tour playoff record (0–1)

PGA Tour of Australasia wins (1)

1Co-sanctioned by the Nationwide Tour

Nationwide Tour wins (4)

1Co-sanctioned by the PGA Tour of Australasia

Nationwide Tour playoff record (0–1)

Results in major championships

CUT = missed the half-way cut
"T" = tied

Results in The Players Championship

CUT = missed the halfway cut
"T" indicates a tie for a place

Results in World Golf Championships

See also
1998 Nike Tour graduates
1999 PGA Tour Qualifying School graduates
2003 Nationwide Tour graduates
2009 PGA Tour Qualifying School graduates
List of golfers with most Web.com Tour wins

References

External links

American male golfers
Duke Blue Devils men's golfers
PGA Tour golfers
Korn Ferry Tour graduates
Golfers from Ohio
People from Lancaster, Ohio
Golfers from Austin, Texas
1974 births
Living people